Godegård is a locality situated in Motala Municipality, Östergötland County, Sweden with 200 inhabitants in 2010. The Mjölby-Hallsberg railway line runs through the village.

References 

Populated places in Östergötland County
Populated places in Motala Municipality